Thanasi Kokkinakis was the defending champion but chose not to participate.

Rogério Dutra Silva won the title after defeating Bjorn Fratangelo 6–3, 6–1 in the final.

Seeds

Draw

Finals

Top half

Bottom half

External Links
Main Draw
Qualifying Draw

BNP Paribas Primrose Bordeaux - Singles